Wang Yin may refer to:

 Wang Yin (actor) (1901–1988), Chinese/Taiwanese actor and filmmaker
 Wang Yin (Water Margin), a fictional character in the novel Water Margin